Woman, Woman is the Gold-selling debut album by Gary Puckett & The Union Gap, released in early 1968.

The title track hit #3 on the Cash Box Top 100 and #4 on the Billboard Hot 100.  The album landed on the Billboard 200 chart, reaching #22.

Track listing

Side 1
 "Woman, Woman" (Jim Glaser, Jimmy Payne)
 "M'Lady" (Steve Karliski)
 "By the Time I Get to Phoenix" (Jimmy Webb)
 "Paindrops" (Jerry Fuller)
 "Believe Me" (Gary Puckett)
 "I Want a New Day" (Kerry Chater)

Side 2
 "You Better Sit Down Kids" (Sonny Bono)
 "Kentucky Woman" (Neil Diamond)
 "My Son (version 1)" (Gary Withem, Kerry Chater)
 "To Love Somebody" (Barry Gibb, Robin Gibb)
 "Don't Make Promises" (Tim Hardin)

Personnel
The Union Gap
Gary Puckett - lead vocals, guitar
Kerry Chater - bass guitar
Gary "Mutha" Withem - organ, piano, soprano saxophone, flute
Dwight Bemont - tenor saxophone
Paul Wheatbread - drums

Additional personnel
Al Capps - orchestral arrangements
Jerry Fuller - production

Chart positions
Album

Singles

References

1968 albums
Gary Puckett & The Union Gap albums
Columbia Records albums